Ancient Cross-Dressing Songs is a 2009 EP by Rasputina. The album contains 3 ancient folksongs about female-to-male crossdressers. It also features a personal message from the band's front woman, Melora Creager. Much like their two previous EPs, Melora a la Basilica and The Willow Tree Triptych, the album is available only via the band's website and is hand-crafted by Creager herself. Of the decision in not using the distribution services of a record label, she opines that,

Track listing

Album details
Original Release Date: 2009
Label: none
Recording Mode: Stereo
Recording Type: Studio
Producer: Melora Creager
Distributor: self-distributed
Rasputina: Melora Creager (cello, vocals)

References

2009 EPs
Rasputina (band) albums